Sarju Sagar Dam also known as Kot Dam is a dam across the Shakambhari Hills. It is situated 13 kilometres from Udaipurwati town in Jhunjhunu, Rajasthan, India. The dam was constructed between 1923 and1924 for the purposes of Irrigation and Water Storage.

A river flows from it that's name is "Saptrupi river" , this flows from Kot dam to udaipurwati

Gallery

Nearest places
 Shakmbhri Mata mandir, Shakmbhri, Jhunjhunu
 Dhabkyari Balaji, Kot
 D.D. Market, Kot
Sachin general Store
 Bhargaw CSC centre 
Bhargaw e- Mitra

References

External links 
 http://jhunjhunu.rajasthan.gov.in

Dams in Rajasthan
Jhunjhunu district
1924 establishments in India
Tourist attractions in Jhunjhunu district